Werner Gysin (* 1915, †1998) was a Swiss mathematician who introduced the Gysin sequence and Gysin homomorphism in his only published paper .

Gysin obtained his Ph.D from ETH Zurich in 1941 with a thesis written under the direction of Heinz Hopf 
and Eduard Stiefel.

References

20th-century Swiss mathematicians
1915 births
Topologists
ETH Zurich alumni
1998 deaths